West Glacier station is a station stop for the Amtrak Empire Builder in West Glacier, Montana. The station building, constructed in 1910 and enlarged in 1935, was donated to the Glacier Natural History Association in 1991 and now houses the offices and bookstore of the Glacier National Park Conservancy. Amtrak ticketing and other passenger services are not available. The adjacent track and platform continue to be owned by BNSF Railway. The station is historically known as Belton, and that former name continues to be displayed on the station building.

References

External links 

 West Glacier station (USA Rail Guide – Train Web)
 Glacier Natural History Association

Amtrak stations in Montana
Railway stations in the United States opened in 1893
Buildings and structures in Flathead County, Montana
Transportation in Flathead County, Montana
Former Great Northern Railway (U.S.) stations
1893 establishments in Montana